The 1986–87 Fulham RLFC season was the seventh in the club's history. They competed in the 1986–87 Second Division of the Rugby Football League. They also competed in the 1987 Challenge Cup, 1986–87 Lancashire Cup and the 1986–87 League Cup. They finished the season in 12th place in the second tier of British professional rugby league.

1986-87 Second Division table
A complicated fixture formula was introduced in the Second Division and continued until the 1991–92 season.

1986-87 squad

References

External links
Rugby League Project

London Broncos seasons
London Broncos season
1986 in rugby league by club
1986 in English rugby league
London Broncos season
1987 in rugby league by club
1987 in English rugby league